This is a partial list of colleges and universities located inside the Metro Manila region only, Philippines.

State universities and local colleges
City of Malabon University
City University of Pasay
Colegio de Muntinlupa
Eulogio "Amang" Rodriguez Institute of Science and Technology
Marikina Polytechnic College
National Defense College of the Philippines
Navotas Polytechnic College
Pamantasan ng Lungsod ng Marikina
Pamantasan ng Lungsod ng Maynila
Pamantasan ng Lungsod ng Muntinlupa
Pamantasan ng Lungsod ng Pasig
Pamantasan ng Lungsod ng Valenzuela
 Parañaque City College of Science and Technology
Pateros Technological College
Philippine Normal University
Philippine Public Safety College
Philippine State College of Aeronautics
Polytechnic University of the Philippines Manila (Main Campus)
Polytechnic University of the Philippines Parañaque
Polytechnic University of the Philippines Quezon City
Polytechnic University of the Philippines San Juan
Polytechnic University of the Philippines Taguig
Quezon City University
Quezon City University - Batasan Hills
Quezon City University - San Bartolome
Quezon City University - San Francisco
Rizal Technological University
Taguig City University
Technological University of the Philippines Manila (Main Campus)
Technological University of the Philippines (Taguig Campus)
Universidad de Manila
University of the Philippines
University of the Philippines Diliman
University of the Philippines Manila
University of Caloocan City (Congressional Campus)
University of Makati
Valenzuela City Polytechnic College

Private universities and colleges

A
ABE International Business College Caloocan
ABE International Business College Cubao
ABE International Business College Fairview
ABE International Business College Las Piñas
ABE International Business College Makati
ABE International Business College Manila
ABE International Business College Taft
Access Computer College Manila 
Access Computer College Cubao 
Access Computer College Camarin
Access Computer College Lagro 
Access Computer College Marikina
Access Computer College Monumento 
Access Computer College Pasig 
Access Computer College Zabarte
Adamson University
Air Link International Aviation College
AMA Computer Learning Center Commonwealth
AMA Computer University
UST Angelicum College
Arellano University
Arellano University, Malabon
Arellano University, Mandaluyong
Arellano University, Pasay
Arellano University, Pasig
Asia Pacific College
Asia School of Arts and Sciences
Asian College Quezon City
Asian Institute of Computer Studies Bicutan
Asian Institute of Computer Studies Caloocan
Asian Institute of Computer Studies Commonwealth
Asian Institute for Distance Education
Asian Institute of Journalism and Communication
Asian Institute of Management
Asian Institute of Maritime Studies
Asian School of Hospitality Arts
Asian Social Institute
Asian Summit College
Assumption College San Lorenzo
Ateneo de Manila University

B
Bestlink College of the Philippines
Bernardo College

C
CAP College Foundation
Central Colleges of the Philippines
Centro Escolar University 
Centro Escolar University Makati
Chiang Kai Shek College
Chinese General Hospital Colleges
CIIT College of Arts and Technology
Colegio de San Juan de Letran
Colegio de Santa Teresa de Avila – Novaliches, Quezon City
College of Divine Wisdom
College of the Holy Spirit Manila
Concordia College (Manila)
College of St.Catherine Quezon City
College of Arts & Sciences of Asia & the Pacific

D
Datamex Institute of Computer Technology
Dee Hwa Liong College Foundation
De La Salle Araneta University
De La Salle–College of Saint Benilde
De La Salle University
De Ocampo Memorial College – Nagtahan, Santa Mesa, Manila
Don Bosco Technical College
DLS–STI College
Dr. Filemon C. Aguilar Memorial College of Las Piñas
Dr. Carlos S. Lanting College (Quezon City)
Dominican College (San Juan)

E
Emmanuel John Institute of Science & Technology (EJIST)
Emilio Aguinaldo College
Enderun Colleges
Entrepreneurs School of Asia (formerly Thames International School)

F
Far Eastern University
Far Eastern University – Makati
Far Eastern University Alabang (FEU Alabang)
Far Eastern University Diliman (FEU Diliman)
Far Eastern University – Nicanor Reyes Medical Foundation (FEU NRMF)
FEU Roosevelt Marikina (FEU Roosevelt)
Far Eastern University – Institute of Technology (FEU Tech)
FEATI University

G
Gateways Institute of Science and Technology (3 campuses in MM)
Global City Innovative College, Bonifacio Global City
Grace Christian College
Greenville College
Greatways Technical Institute Makati
Global Reciprocal Colleges Caloocan
Governor Andres Pascual College
Guzman College of Science and Technology in Quiapo, Manila

I
Immaculada Concepcion College
Immaculate Heart of Mary College-Parañaque
Imus Computer College (ICC) (2 campuses in MM)
Informatics International College (multiple campuses)
iAcademy – Makati
Infotech Institute of Arts and Sciences
Integrated Innovations and Hospitality College, Inc. (IIH College) – Novaliches, Zabarte
Interface Computer College (ICC)
ICC Manila
ICC Caloocan
International Academy of Management and Economics
International Baptist College (I.B.C.)
International Electronics and Technical Institute Inc. (I.E.T.I.) (multiple campuses)

J
Jose Rizal University
Jesus Reigns Christian College

K
Kalayaan College

L
La Concordia College
La Consolacion College Manila
La Verdad Christian College
Lacson College Pasay
Lyceum of the Philippines University

M
Mandaluyong College
Manila Adventist College
Manila Business College
Manila Central University
Manila Christian Computer Institute for the Deaf
The Manila Times College
Manila Tytana Colleges (formerly Manila Doctors College)
Manuel L. Quezon University
Mapúa University
Mapúa University - Makati
Mary Chiles College of Nursing
Mary Johnston College of Nursing
MFI Technological Institute
Meridian International Business, Arts & Technology College (MINT College)
Medici di Makati College
Metro Manila College, U-Site Jordan Plaines, Kaligayahan, Novaliches, Quezon City
Metropolitan Hospital College of Nursing
Metropolitan Medical Center College of Arts, Science & Technology
Miriam College

N
NAMEI Polytechnic Institute
National College of Business and Arts
 NCBA - Cubao, Quezon City 
 NCBA - Fairview, Quezon City
 NCBA - Taytay, Rizal
National Teachers College Manila
National University (Philippines)
 NU - MOA
New Era University, Quezon City

O
Olivarez College 
Our Lady of Fatima University
OLFU-Quezon City 
Our Lady of Guadalupe Colleges, Mandaluyong
Our Lady of Perpetual Succor College

P
Pacific InterContinental College (PIC), Inc.
Pasig Catholic College
PATTS College of Aeronautics
Perpetual Help College of Manila
Philippine Christian University
Philippine College of Criminology
Philippine College of Health Sciences
Philippine Cultural College
Philippine Merchant Marine Academy
Philippine Merchant Marine School
Philippine Rehabilitation Institute
Philippine School of Business Administration Manila
Philippine Women's University
Philsin College Foundation
PMI Colleges (formerly Philippine Maritime Institute)
 PMI Colleges Manila
 PMI Colleges Quezon City

S
St. Clare College of Caloocan
St. Dominic Savio College
Saint Francis of Assisi College
SFAC Las Piñas 
SFAC Taguig 
SFAC Muntinlupa 
St. James College of Quezon City
Saint Joseph's College of Quezon City
Saint Jude College
St. Louis College Valenzuela
Saint Mary's College of Quezon City
St. Paul University System
St. Paul University Manila
St. Paul University Quezon City
St. Paul College of Makati
St. Paul College of Parañaque
St. Paul College Pasig
Saint Pedro Poveda College
Saint Rita College (Manila)
St. Rita College Parañaque
St. Scholastica's College Manila
Saint Theresa's College of Quezon City
San Beda University 
San Beda University(Mendiola, Manila)
San Beda College-Alabang(Alabang Hills Village, Muntinlupa)
San Juan de Dios Educational Foundation – Pasay
San Sebastian College – Recoletos de Manila
Santa Catalina College
Santa Isabel College Manila
Southeastern College
Silliman University
Siena College of Quezon City
STI College
STI College - Alabang
STI College - Caloocan
STI College - Cubao
STI College - Fairview
STI College - Global City
STI College - Las Pinas
STI College - Makati
STI College - Marikina
STI College - Muñoz
STI College - Novaliches
STI College - Parañaque
STI College - Pasay
STI College - Quezon Avenue
STI College - Recto
STI College - Shaw
STI College - Taft Avenue

T
Technological Institute of the Philippines
Technological Institute of the Philippines - Manila
Technological Institute of the Philippines - Quezon City
The One School
Thames Business School
Trace College Makati
Treston International College Taguig
Trinity University of Asia (formerly Trinity College of Quezon City)

U
Unciano Paramedical Colleges Inc. – Guadalcanal, Santa Mesa, Manila
Universal College
University of Asia and the Pacific, Ortigas Center, Pasig
University of Manila
University of Perpetual Help System DALTA
University of Santo Tomas
University of the East 
University of the East Caloocan
University of the East Ramon Magsaysay Memorial Medical Center

W
Wesleyan College of Manila
West Bay College
World Citi Colleges 
WCC Caloocan
WCC Quezon City

See also
List of universities and colleges in the Philippines (located in provinces in Luzon, Visayas, and Mindanao regions)
Higher education in the Philippines

References

External links
List of universities in Metro Manila
List of universities in Manila (city)

 
Metro Manila
Universities
Manila